Ariagny Idayari Daboín Ricardo (born 3 January 1997) is a Venezuelan actress, TV host, psychologyst, model and beauty pageant titleholder who was crowned Miss World Venezuela 2021. She represented the state of Cojedes at the pageant and will represent Venezuela at the Miss World 2023 competition.

Life and career

Early life and education
Daboín was born and raised in Maracay, Aragua. Ariagny obtained a bachelor's degree as a clinical psychologist from the Bicentenary University of Aragua in Turmero.

Ariagny is a pole sport teacher and has practiced volleyball for several years. She also served as a reporter for the local newspaper El Siglo of Maracay. From the age of 7 she ventured into the world of modeling, and at 18 she made her first attempt to join the ranks of Miss Venezuela.

Daboín during her academic training as a psychologist has participated in different social activities aimed at children at risk. She has also volunteered for soup kitchens, dynamic activities for children in low-income schools or street activities such as gift-giving, and visits to various seniors.

Pageantry

Miss Venezuela 2021 
Daboín represented the Cojedes state in Miss Venezuela 2021. Ariagny competed with 17 other candidates for the disputed title, being considered a moderate favorite to obtain a title on the final night.

At the end of Miss Venezuela 2021 held on September 24, 2020, Conde was crowned Miss World Venezuela 2021. She will represent Venezuela in Miss World 2023. Daboín succeeded Miss World Venezuela 2020, Alejandra Conde and was crowned by her at the final event. Her court included Miss Venezuela Universe 2021, Amanda Dudamel from Región Andina. Since her crowning, Conde has attended many events with her fellow Miss Venezuela and Mister Venezuela titleholders.

The last representative of the Cojedes state to obtain the title of Miss Venezuela World was Hannelly Quintero in 2007.

Miss World 2023 
She will represent Venezuela at the Miss World 2023 pageant.

References

1997 births
Living people
Miss World 2022 delegates
Venezuelan female models 
Venezuelan beauty pageant winners
Miss Venezuela winners 
People from Maracay